TS1 may refer to:

Taylor Swift (album), the 2006 debut album by Taylor Swift
The Sims (video game), a 2000 strategic life-simulation video game
Toy Story, a 1995 American computer-animated family film